Rapid React, stylized as RAPID REACT and officially known as Rapid React presented by The Boeing Company for sponsorship reasons, is the FIRST Robotics Competition (FRC) game for the 2022 season. The game is themed around transportation as part of the FIRST-wide FIRST Forward theme for 2021-2022.

Rapid React is played by two alliances of three teams each, with each team controlling a robot and completing specific actions in order to score points. The game revolves around both alliances shooting inflatable balls known as Cargo into a central Hub and climbing within their Hangars at the end of the match. The overall objective of each match is to score more points than the opposing alliance before the match ends.

The 2022 season was the first season since 2016 to feature a single championship, which took place in Houston, Texas on April 20 to April 23. As a result of the reduction from two championships to one, 456 teams were invited to compete at the championship as opposed to over 800 teams in 2019.

Kickoff
Kickoff occurred on January 8, 2022. It was streamed live on Twitch, with the broadcast beginning at 11:45 A.M. Eastern Time. The game was revealed approximately 45 minutes into the broadcast, which featured presentations from teams and game sponsors.

Similar to the 2021 kickoff, many kickoff events were hosted online, with the only in-person event being part pick-up. Some of these events were originally scheduled to be online, while others switched to virtual due to the COVID-19 pandemic.

Field and Scoring
Rapid React is played on a 27 ft. (~823 cm) by 54 ft. (~1646 cm) field covered in grey carpet. The field is surrounded by low polycarbonate walls on the long sides and higher polycarbonate driver station walls on the short sides. The field is divided in half by a white line. The primary scoring area, called the Hub, is surrounded by four taped-off areas known as Tarmacs (two red and two blue) where robots start the match. At the end of the match, robots can climb monkey bars in areas called the Hangars.

Alliance Station
Each alliance has their own alliance station on their end of the field, divided into three smaller stations (one for each team). The alliance stations are flanked by the alliance's Hangar on one side and a Terminal on the other side.

Terminals
Alliances can use the Terminals to introduce Cargo into the field and return Cargo to their human players. Either alliance can use either Terminal, as opposed to player stations in previous games which were restricted to one alliance. Due to this, human players in the terminals must wear alliance-colored aprons to identify themselves.

Cargo
Cargo is the only game element in Rapid React. Each Cargo is an oversized inflatable tennis ball with a diameter of 9.5 in. (~24 cm). There are 22 Cargo on the field, 11 per alliance.

Scoring Areas

Hub
There is one Hub in the center of the field, and both alliances can score in it. There are two levels, a lower hub 3 ft 5 in (~104 cm) above the field and an upper hub 8 ft. 8 in. (~264 cm) above the field. Robots earn more points by shooting into the upper hub compared to shooting into the lower hub. The upper hub is smaller than the lower hub, which combined with its height makes it harder to score into.

Scoring in the lower hub is worth two points in autonomous mode and one point in teleoperated mode, while scoring in the upper hub is worth four points and two points respectively. Alliances can earn a ranking point by scoring 20 Cargo in the Hub, or 18 Cargo if the alliance scored 5 Cargo in autonomous mode. This is known as the Cargo Bonus.

Hangars
Hangars are large trusses with four legs, similar to the Shield Generator in Infinite Recharge. There are two Hangars, one for each alliance. At the end of the match, robots can climb onto the monkey bars in their alliance's Hangar to earn climb points. There are four levels, with the lowest bar positioned 4 ft. 3/4 in. (~124 cm) above the field and the highest bar positioned 7 ft. 7 in. (~231 cm) above the field. Robots may not extend to be taller than 5 ft. 6 in. (~168cm) at any point in the match, so reaching higher monkey bars requires a robot to swinging onto one from a lower monkey bar.

Teams earn more points for climbing to higher levels of the monkey bars. The lowest level is worth 4 points, with the other three levels worth 6 points, 10 points, and 15 points respectively. Alliances can earn the Hangar Bonus by scoring at least 16 climb points.

Launch Pads
Each alliance's Hangar also provides two safe zones called the Launch Pads, which allow that alliance's robots to shoot Cargo into the Hub without being contacted by opponent robots. The Launch Pads are identified by strips of alliance-colored plastic on the bottom of the two Hub-facing legs of each Hangar, and a team can enter the safe zone by touching one of their alliance's Launch Pads with their robot's bumper. A team is assessed a foul if their robot contacts an opponent robot that is touching one of the opponent's Launch Pads.

Scoring Summary

Events
The 2022 season is divided into seven weeks, with many events occurring simultaneously during each week. After Week 7, teams that have qualified compete in the FIRST Championship in Houston. For this season, the FIRST Chesapeake District, Ontario District, and Festival de Robotique Regional moved to one-day events as part of their COVID-19 pandemic plan. These events are noted below.

Week 1

Week 2

Week 3

Week 4

Week 5

Week 6

Week 7

FIRST Championship

World Championship Results
The following tables show the winners of each division and the divisional playoff results.

Division Winners

Divisional Playoff

Round Robin 
<onlyinclude>

Einstein Finals

References

Notes

Robotics competitions
FIRST Robotics Competition games